Stříbrnice is a municipality and village in Přerov District in the Olomouc Region of the Czech Republic. It has about 300 inhabitants.

Notable people
Josef Vrana (1905–1987), Roman Catholic bishop

References

Villages in Přerov District